The Luzerne County Council is the governing body of Luzerne County, Pennsylvania. The council meets at the Luzerne County Courthouse in Wilkes-Barre. There are eleven members on the assembly (ten Republicans and one Democrat). The chair is both the highest-ranking officer on the council and the head of county government for ceremonial purposes. When the group is not in session, the officer's duties often include acting as its representative to the outside world and its spokesperson. The current chair is Kendra Radle.

History
Luzerne County voters rejected home rule proposals in the past (once in 1974 and again in 2003). However, from 2008 to 2010, corruption plagued county government. Three county judges, a county commissioner, a clerk of courts, a deputy chief clerk, and a director of human resources faced criminal charges. These events persuaded the voters of Luzerne County to adopt a new form of government. On Tuesday, November 2, 2010, a home rule charter was adopted by a margin of 51,413 to 41,639.

The following year (in 2011), the first election for the new government was held. On Monday, January 2, 2012, the previous government (the board of county commissioners) was abolished and replaced with the new form of government (council–manager government). The first members of the Luzerne County Council were sworn in that same day. The first council chair was Jim Bobeck.

Election process

The Luzerne County Council is elected by the voters of the county. Nearly half the council is up for election every two years. It rotates between five and six seats. Each council member is elected at-large (to a four-year term). They are limited to three consecutive terms. In the May primary, the major political parties (Democratic and Republican) select their top candidates for the general election. For example, those who place in the top five or six become the nominees of their party. Third party (or independent) candidates may also join the race. In the November general election, all political parties/candidates square off on the same ballot. Those who place in the top five or six will be elected or re-elected to council.

Current council members
The following members have been duly elected to county council by the voters of Luzerne County:

List of council chairs
The following chairs were elected by council:

Former council members

References

Luzerne County, Pennsylvania
Government of Luzerne County, Pennsylvania